A fourth-dimension roller coaster is a type of steel roller coaster whereby riders are rotated independently of the orientation of the track, generally about a horizontal axis that is perpendicular to the track.  The cars do not necessarily need to be fixed to an angle.

History
In this concept, riders control the spinning action themselves.

The first fourth dimension roller coaster to be built, X2, which opened at Six Flags Magic Mountain in 2002, was designed and patented by Alan Schilke. In 2007, Intamin launched a variation of the 4th Dimension roller coaster under the name ZacSpin.

Design

Arrow Dynamics and S&S Worldwide

Arrow Dynamics was the first company to produce a fourth dimension roller coaster, lending its name to the ride style. The trains feature seats capable of rotating forward or backward, 360 degrees in a controlled spin. This is achieved by having four rails on the track; two acting as per normal, and two to control the spin of the seats. The two rails that control the spin of the seats, known as "X Rails", vary in height relative to the track, and spin the train using a rack and pinion gear mechanism.

The first installation, X², was a prototype and cost Arrow Dynamics and Six Flags itself a lot of money due to technical difficulties and design flaws. In 2002, the park sued Arrow Dynamics, which went into bankruptcy. Since then, Arrow was bought out by S&S Worldwide and became the company's steel coaster division, S&S Arrow. In 2006, a second installation opened at Fuji-Q Highland in Fujiyoshida, Yamanashi Japan under the name Eejanaika. A third installation opened in 2012 at China Dinosaurs Park in China under the name Dinoconda.

Intamin ZacSpin first generation
The Intamin ZacSpin was developed in response to the Arrow Dynamics fourth-dimension roller coaster. Some of the main differences between the Intamin and Arrow Dynamics/S&S Worldwide versions are the uncontrolled rotation of the seats, which produces a different ride each time, no need for an additional rail, and single cars with two riders back-to-back. Since these single cars don't rotate around the riders but around a common point quite far back behind their backs, this gave rise to complaints of rider discomfort. Another notable difference is the absence of any lateral movements, causing some enthusiasts to not consider the rides to be fourth-dimension roller coasters due to the fact that all movement is restricted to a two-dimensional plane.

Kirnu at Linnanmäki in Helsinki, Finland, opened for the 2007 season and was the first of its kind. Later that year Inferno opened at Terra Mitica in Spain with an identical compact layout. In 2009, Insane opened at Gröna Lund with a different track layout. In 2011, the first ZacSpin in the United States opened at Six Flags Magic Mountain as Green Lantern: First Flight, and was themed to the DC Comics superhero of the same name. It features the same layout as Insane.

S&S Free Spin
In late 2012, S&S Worldwide unveiled a new concept called Free Spin which features a similar ride to Intamin ZacSpin. Each vehicle features two seating rows, and each row rotates independently. Because the axis of rotation is at the center of mass of each guest, rider comfort is significantly improved. Like with ZacSpin, Seats spin freely, but during several track sections a system of magnets forces a controlled inversion. The first installation of a 4D Free Spin was Batman: The Ride at Six Flags Fiesta Texas in 2015.

Intamin ZacSpin second generation
In 2016, Intamin announced an updated version that like Free Spin also features a vehicle with two seating rows rotating independently, and an axis of rotation at the center of mass of each guest to improve rider comfort.

Inversion ambiguity
There is considerable debate within the roller coaster community as to whether or not the spinning of these coasters qualifies as an inversion for the purpose of records. Guinness World Records gave Eejanaika the record with 14 inversions. However, other more coaster-specific record bodies such as the Roller Coaster Database do not recognize this claim and instead count only track inversions, which gives the record of 14 to The Smiler.

Installations

See also
 Wing Coaster – a type of ride by Bolliger & Mabillard which features similar trains to the S&S/Arrow design

References

External links 

A list of fourth-dimension roller coasters at the Roller Coaster DataBase

 
Types of roller coaster
S&S – Sansei Technologies